Myroides pelagicus is a Gram-negative, rod-shaped, aerobic and non-motile bacterium from the genus of Myroides which has been isolated from seawater from Thailand.

References

External links
microbewiki

Flavobacteria
Bacteria described in 2006